Giuseppe Angelini, known as la Regina (circa 1675 - November 20, 1751) was an Italian painter.

He was born in Ascoli Piceno. He first trained locally under Ludovico Trasi and then moved to work under Giuseppe Giosafatti and later Carlo Palucci. He gained his nickname when he served as an actor dressed as Queen Dido. He painted flowers, ornaments and landscapes. He died of a stroke in Ascoli, and buried in the parish church of San Martino.

References

1675 births
1751 deaths
People from the Province of Ascoli Piceno
17th-century Italian painters
Italian male painters
18th-century Italian painters
Italian Baroque painters
18th-century Italian male artists